Simon Dow was born on 13 June 1961. He is a first generation racehorse trainer and is based on the Epsom Downs. He has had several horses that have enjoyed fan club status. These include Dark Honey, Confronter, Young Ern and Chief's Song.

More recently horses such as Birkspiel (owned by Soccer AM's Helen Chamberlain) Aurigny, Nagnagnag, Turtle Valley, Gallery God, Bettalatethannever and Quantum Leap have kept the winners flowing.

External links
Simon Dow

British racehorse trainers
Living people
1961 births
Place of birth missing (living people)